Labarkot is a village and union council (an administrative subdivision) of Mansehra District in Khyber-Pakhtunkhwa province of Pakistan. It is located at 34°21'0N 73°13'60E

Tribes
  Gujjar (Khattana)
 Tanoli
 Swati
 Sulaimankhel
  Khattak
  Mulakhel, Malakhail
  Ibrahimkhel
  Turk
 Rajpoots
  Awan.

References

Union councils of Mansehra District
Populated places in Mansehra District